Eddie & the Showmen were an American surf rock band of the 1960s. Formed in Southern California by Eddie Bertrand, formerly of The Bel-Airs, they released several singles on Liberty Records.  Their highest-charting single in Los Angeles was "Mr. Rebel", which reached number four on the Wallichs Music City Hit List on February 10, 1964.

The band originally formed because Bertrand wanted to move on from the Bel-Airs. While the Bel-Airs focused more on guitar interplay, and a moderate sound, Eddie & the Showmen played more in the style of Dick Dale with a prominent lead guitar and heavy sound.  The band's original drummer was former Mouseketeer Dick Dodd, who later joined The Standells.  One of the guitar players, Larry Carlton, later became a famous jazz guitarist, and another was Rob Edwards of Colours who was the guitarist on the title track for the surf movie, Pacific Vibrations.
  
One of Eddie & the Showmen's biggest hits, "Squad Car", was written by Paul Johnson of the Bel-Airs. 
Eddie and the Showmen are included in the Hard Rock Cafe: Surf 1998 compilation of surf bands and surf music on track 11. Mr. Rebel.  They are also included in The Birth of Surf compilation track 20 Squad Car  and are on 10 tracks of Toes on the Nose: 32 Surf Age Instrumentals compilation.

Eddie Bertrand died of cancer in November 2012.

Singles
"Toes on the Nose" b/w "Border Town" (Liberty 55566, 1963)
"Squad Car" b/w "Scratch" (Liberty 55608, 1963)
"Mr. Rebel" b/w "Movin'" (Liberty 55659, 1963)
"Lanky Bones" b/w "Far Away Places" (Liberty 55695, 1964)
"We Are the Young" b/w "Young and Lonely" (Liberty 55720, 1964)

Albums
Squad Car (complete singles collection plus 7 bonus tracks) (AVI Records CD-5021/EMI-Capitol Special Markets 72438-18886-29, 1996)

Personnel
 Eddie Bertrand - Composer, Executive Producer, Guitar Producer 
 Rob Edwards - Guitar (Rhythm)
 Brett Brady - Guitar (Rhythm)
 Larry Carlton - Guitar (Rhythm)
 John Anderson - Guitar (Rhythm)
 Freddy Buxton - Bass
 Doug Henson - Bass
 Dick Dodd - Drums
 Michael Mills - Drums
 Bobby Knight - Saxophone 
 Sterling Storm - Saxophone
 Phillip Pruden - Saxophone
 Nokie Edwards - Composer
 R. Dodd - Composer
 Lee Hazlewood - Composer
 Paul Johnson - Composer
 Andreas Kramer - Composer
 Joan Whitney - Composer
 Tom Mouton - Mastering, Mixing
 Greg Vaughn - Mastering, Mixing
 Pete Ciccone - Art Direction, Design
 Patti Drosins - Executive Producer
 Bones Howe - Producer
 Drew Jessel - Assistant Producer
 Lanky Linstrot - Producer
 Dave Pell - Producer
 Stephanie Press - Assistant Producer
 Domenic Priore - Compilation Producer, Liner Notes
 Rob Santos - Compilation Producer
 Jim York - Producer

References

Surf music groups
Liberty Records artists
Musical groups established in 1963
Rock music groups from California
Instrumental rock musical groups
Musical groups from Los Angeles
American instrumental musical groups